Samuel Foley may refer to:

Samuel Foley (bishop) (1655–1695), bishop of Down and Connor
Samuel J. Foley (politician) (1862–1922), state assemblyman and state senator from New York, and father of the district attorney
Samuel J. Foley (district attorney) (1891–1951), district attorney in Bronx County, New York, and son of the politician